Nishank Kumar Jain is an Indian politician and a member of the Indian National Congress party. He is currently Vidisha district president, Indian National Congress.

Career

Political career
He became an MLA in 2013.

He had given Dharna for the compensation to be given to farmers in 2015–16.

Political Views
He supports Congress Party's ideology.

Personal life
He is married to Nandini Jain.

References

See also

Madhya Pradesh Legislative Assembly
2013 Madhya Pradesh Legislative Assembly election
2008 Madhya Pradesh Legislative Assembly election

Indian National Congress politicians from Madhya Pradesh
1964 births
Living people